is a 1954 black-and-white Japanese film directed by Yoshitaro Nomura.

The film is based on Yasunari Kawabata's 1926 short story The Dancing Girl of Izu. A previous adaptation of the same title had been directed by Heinosuke Gosho in 1933.

Cast 
 Hibari Misora
 Akira Ishihama
 Azusa Yumi
 Akihiko Katayama
 Keiko Yukishiro
 Shinichi Himori
 Yoshie Minami
 Kappei Matsumoto
 Jun Tatara
 Mutsuko Sakura

References

External links 

Japanese black-and-white films
1954 films
Films based on short fiction
Films based on works by Yasunari Kawabata
Films directed by Yoshitaro Nomura
Shochiku films
Japanese romantic drama films
1954 romantic drama films
1950s Japanese films